The knockout stages of the Copa Libertadores 2007 tournament were played on a home and away basis. The aggregate score determines the team advancing to the next round, with the away goals rule and a penalty shootout as tiebreakers, in that order. No extra time is played.

Seeding
The teams have been seeded 1 to 8 (first placed teams from group stage) and 9 to 16 (second placed teams from each group) and the ties will be 1 vs 16, 2 vs 15, etc.

Bracket

(*) To prevent a final with two teams from the same country CONMEBOL has paired Santos FC with
Grêmio in the Semi-Finals.

Match summaries

Round of 16

First leg

Second leg

Quarterfinals

First leg

Second leg

Semifinals

First leg

Second leg

Final

First leg

Second leg

Champion

References
RSSSF

2007 Copa Libertadores